Father José Maria Xavier (23 August 1819 – 22 January 1887) was a Brazilian Roman Catholic priest and composer of sacred music.

Biography 
Xavier was born in São João del-Rei, Minas Gerais, the son of João Xavier da Silva Ferrão and Maria José Benedita de Miranda. He studied music, singing, clarinet, and violin, with his uncle, composer and teacher Francisco de Paula Miranda. He is the patron of Chair Number 12 of the Brazilian Academy of Music.

Works 
More than one hundred works by José Maria Xavier are known, many of large, preserved in archives of musical manuscripts from Minas Gerais, São Paulo, Rio de Janeiro and Goiás. His Christmas Lauds were edited in Germany and are a rare example of 18th century sacred music from Minas Gerais with printed score. He is the author of works for the Office of Palm Sunday, the Office of Darkness and Passion Friday that are played to this day in the celebrations of Holy Week in São João del Rei, and novenas.

Recognition 
In 1872, he received the Silver Medal of the V Industrial Week of Minas Gerais as an award for his works. There are many references to him in literary and historical works, as well as in travel and diaries. Emperor Pedro II refers to him in his diary and mentions admiration for the composer's work, heard on one of his travels (1881) and considered the best work he knew from Minas Gerais.

There is a public music school homonymous in São João del-Rei, inaugurated in 1953. In 2019, his 200th birthday was commemorated there as a feast.

References 

People from São João del-Rei
Sacred music composers
1819 births
1887 deaths
19th-century Brazilian Roman Catholic priests